Chemplast Sanmar Limited is an Indian chemical company. It is a major manufacturer of PVC resins, chlorochemicals and piping systems.

History
The company was formed in 1962 to manufacture PVC resins/compounds and fabricate PVC products. In 1967 a PVC Plant at Mettur was commissioned with a capacity of 6,000 TPA, in collaboration with BF Goodrich. PVC pipes production commenced.  It was among the pioneers to bring PVC pipes to India.

The Cuddalore PVC project was commissioned in September 2009.

In 1985 the company acquired a controlling stake of Mettur Chemical & Industrial Corporation (MCIC) Ltd.

Organization 
Chemplast Sanmar Limited is part of Sanmar Group which has businesses in Chemicals, Shipping, Engineering and Metals. It has a turnover of over 65 billion and a presence in some 25 businesses, with manufacturing units spread over numerous locations in India.

Chemplast Sanmar's manufacturing facilities are located at Mettur, Panruti, Cuddalore and Ponneri in Tamil Nadu, Shinoli in Maharashtra, and Karaikal in the Union Territory of Puducherry. 

Cuddalore PCV is the largest such project in Tamil Nadu. Its aggregate capacity of 235,000 tons makes it one of India's largest PVC players.

Mettur Chemical & Industrial Corporation (MCIC) Ltd makes caustic soda 48000 TPA and chloromethane 11000 TPA.

Recognition 

 "Innovative Case Study" at the 7th National Award for Excellence in Water Management (2010)
 "Excellent Water Efficient Unit" 7th National Award for Excellence in Water Management (20100 for the successful case study of zero liquid discharge at Mettur.

Zero liquid discharge 
Chemplast Sanmar implemented ZLD in all its manufacturing plants. Chemplast has not discharged treated effluent since September 2009 in Mettur while Cuddalore and Karaikkal have never discharged treated effluent.

On 10 August 2021, Chemplast Sanmar opened its Initial public offering at a price band of 530-541 per share.

Sports
The Sanmar Group has supported cricket for over 50 years. Chemplast Sanmar supports Jolly Rovers and the Alwarpet Cricket Club in the Tamil Nadu Cricket Academy (TNCA) 1st Division.

References

External links 
Chemplast Sanmar website

Chemical companies of India
Manufacturing companies based in Chennai
Chemical companies established in 1962
1962 establishments in Madras State
Indian companies established in 1962
Companies listed on the Bombay Stock Exchange
Companies listed on the National Stock Exchange of India